Lon is a given name, nickname, stage name and surname. It may refer to:

Given name, nickname or stage name
 Lon Bender (fl. 1977–present), American Oscar-winning sound editor, business executive and inventor
 Lon Borgerson (born 1950), Canadian politician
 Lonnie Lon Boyett (born 1953), American former National Football League player
 Lon Burnam (born 1953), American politician
 Leonidas Lon Chaney (1883–1930), American actor during the age of silent films
 Lon Chaney, Jr. (1906–1973), stage name of American character actor Creighton Tull Chaney
 Lon Clark (1912–1998), American stage and radio actor
 Lon Milo DuQuette (born 1948), American writer, lecturer and occultist 
 Lon Evans (1911–1992), American National Football League player
 Lon L. Fuller (1902–1978), American legal philosopher
 Lon Haldeman, American ultramarathon cyclist
 Lon Hanagan (1911–1999), physique photographer also known as "Lon of New York" or simply "Lon"
 William Ian Lon Hatherell (born 1930), Australian former rugby union player
 Lon Hinkle (born 1949), American golfer
 Lon Horiuchi (born 1954), accused FBI sniper in the Ruby Ridge shootings and the Waco standoff 
 Lon Jourdet (1888–89 – 1959), head men's basketball coach for the University of Pennsylvania, credited with inventing an early version of the zone defense
 Alonzo Lon Knight (1853–1932), American Major League Baseball player and manager
 Lonnie Lon Kruger (born 1952), American college basketball head coach and former player and former National Basketball Association head coach
 Herbert Alonzo Lon McCallister (1923–2005), American actor
 Lon McEachern, poker analyst on The World Series of Poker
 Laurence Lon Myers (1858–1899), American world-record-setting runner
 Lon Oden (1863–1910), Texas Ranger of the American Old West
 Leonardus Lon Pennock (born 1945), Dutch sculptor, environmental and monumental artist and photographer
 Alonzo Lon Poff (1870–1952), American film actor
 Lon A. Scott (1888–1931), American politician
 Lonnie Lon Simmons (1923–2015), American baseball and football broadcaster
 Alonzo Lon Stiner (1903–1985), American college football player and head coach
 Lon Tinkle (1906–1980), American historian, author, book critic and professor
 half of the Lon & Derrek Van Eaton American vocal and multi-instrumentalist duo
 Lawrence Lon Vest Stephens (1858–1923), American politician, 29th Governor of Missouri
 Lonnie Lon Warneke (1909–1976), American Major League Baseball pitcher
 Lon Williams (1890–1978), American pulp western writer

Surname
 Alice Lon (1926–1981), singer and dancer on The Lawrence Welk Show
 Lon Nil (died 1970), Cambodian police commissioner, brother of Lon Nol
 Lon Nol (1913–1985), Cambodian politician, Prime Minister and Defence Minister of Cambodia 
 Lon Non (1930-1975), Cambodian politician and soldier, brother of Lon Nol

See also
 W. Lon Johnson (1882-1967), American politician

Lists of people by nickname